Three ships of the Royal Navy have been named HMS Miranda.

 was a screw sloop launched in 1851. She was redesignated a corvette in 1862 and scrapped in 1869.
 was an  sloop launched in 1879 and sold in 1892.
 was a M-class destroyer launched in 1914 and sold in 1921.

References
 

Royal Navy ship names